Ilse Dörffeldt (23 March 1912 – 14 September 1992) was a German sprinter who competed at the 1936 Berlin Olympics. Her 4 × 100 m team set a world record in the semifinals and led the final until a missed exchange in the final leg. She was part of the German teams that set 4 × 200 m relay world records in 1938 and 1940. After retiring from competitions she taught sports, history and German language in Banzendorf and later in East Berlin.

References

1912 births
1992 deaths
German female sprinters
Athletes (track and field) at the 1936 Summer Olympics
Olympic athletes of Germany
Athletes from Berlin
Olympic female sprinters